The High Commissioner for Antigua and Barbuda to the United Kingdom is the official representative of the Government of Antigua and Barbuda to the Government of the United Kingdom.
The High Commissioner to London is regularly accredited as Ambassador to Berlin, Madrid, Moscow, Rome and Paris, where he is Permanent Representative to the UNESCO.

History
The islands achieved independence from the United Kingdom in 1981.

References 

United Kingdom
Antigua and Barbuda